A list of prehistoric and extinct species whose fossils have been found in the La Brea Tar Pits, located in present-day Hancock Park, a city park on the Miracle Mile section of the Mid-Wilshire district in Los Angeles, California.

Some of the tar pit's fossils are displayed in the adjacent George C. Page Museum of La Brea Discoveries in the park. They are primarily from Pleistocene predator species. Daggers (†) in the list denote extinct species.

Mammals

Artiodactyla

Carnivora

Chiroptera

Lagomorpha

Perissodactyla

Primates

Proboscidea

Rodentia

Soricomorpha

Xenarthra

Birds

Accipitriformes

Anseriformes

Caprimulgiformes

Cathartiformes

Ciconiiformes

Charadriiformes

Columbiformes

Cuculiformes

Falconiformes

Galliformes

Gruiformes

Strigiformes

Passeriformes

Pelecaniformes

Piciformes

Podicipediformes

Suliformes

Reptiles

Amphibians

Fish

Arthropods

Arachnids

Crustaceans

Insects

Myriapods

Diatoms

Charophyte green algaes

Characeae

Conifers

Cupressaceae

Pinaceae

Monocot flowering plants

Order Poales

Order Alismatales

Order Liliales

Dicot flowering plants

Order Campanulales

Juglandaceae

Salicaceae

Ulmaceae

Betulaceae

Fagaceae

Caryophyllales

Chenopodiaceae

Amaranthaceae

Portulacaceae

Ranunculaceae

Berberidaceae

Lauraceae

Platanaceae

Rosaceae

Anacardiaceae

Aceraceae

Balsaminaceae

Rhamnaceae

Malvaceae

Apiaceae

Cornaceae

Ericaceae

Convolvulaceae

Lamiaceae

Scrophulariacaea

Verbenaceae

Rubiaceae

Caprifoliaceae

Notes

References

External links
 Official George C. Page Museum at the La Brea Tar Pits in Hancock Park website

La Brea Tar Pits
La Brea Tar Pits, fossils
La Brea Tar Pits
L
La Brea Tar Pits, List
La Brea Tar Pits, List
La Brea Tar Pits, List
La Brea Tar Pits fossils
Fossils La Brea Tar Pits
La Brea Tar Pits, List